Wolf Hill may refer to:

 Langshan (Nantong) or Wolf Hill, China

See also
 Wolfhill, a village in Perthshire, Scotland